A-Haunting We Will Go is a stageplay written by prolific playwright Tim Kelly and published in 1981. Billed as a "full-length mystery-comedy," it has a cast of 20, and contains two acts.  It is set in the Southwestern United States, in an abandoned, supposedly haunted hotel called "The Inn of the Three Sisters."

The protagonist is Norma Corwin, a successful television producer. She comes to the hotel, intent on staying the night there alone, thereby fulfilling a childhood vow. As the night progresses, a variety of mysterious characters come onto the scene, some seemingly harmless, and others markedly malicious. The mystery surmounts with spirit manifestations and murder.

References

External links 
Publisher's webpage
Script on Google Books
Review - Edinburgh Festival Fringe 2006
Review - The WeekExtra.com
The Internet Theatre Bookshop

1981 plays
American plays
Southwestern United States in fiction